Perittia carlinella is a moth of the family Elachistidae. It is found on the Canary Islands and Madeira.

The wingspan is 10–11 mm. The forewings are white, dusted with pale greyish brown scales. The hindwings are grey.

The larvae feed on Carlina salicifolia. They mine the leaves of their host plant. The mine starts as an upper-surface, slightly contorted corridor. Later, it widens into an elliptic blotch. Pupation takes place in the blotch. Larvae can be found from March to April.

References

Moths described in 1908
Elachistidae
Moths of Africa